The 1954 All-American Girls Professional Baseball League season marked the twelfth and last season of the circuit. The AAGPBL was left with five teams after the Muskegon Belles franchise folded at the end of the past season. As a result, it was the lowest number of teams since its opening season in 1943. The Fort Wayne Daisies, Grand Rapids Chicks, Kalamazoo Lassies, Rockford Peaches and South Bend Blue Sox competed through a 96-game schedule, while the Shaugnessy playoffs featured the top four teams in a best-of-three first round series, with the two winning teams facing in a best-of-five series to decide the championship.

Regular season
Several changes were made to the rules for this season, making the game much like Major League Baseball. The ball size was reduced from 10 inches to 9 inches, while the pitching distance increased from 56 to 60 feet. In addition, the base paths were lengthened from 75 to 85 feet, five feet short of the major leagues. But the most significant change was the shortening of the outfield fences, which dramatically increased the number of home runs hit in the past. The five teams combined to hit 408 home runs, which tripled the number of homers hit during a regular season.

Joanne Weaver of Fort Wayne won her third consecutive batting title in a row, this time clearing the .400 batting average barrier with a .429 mark. Not since Ted Williams in the majors in 1941 (.406) and minor leaguer Artie Wilson in 1948 (.402) had someone broken the .400 barrier, and nobody has done it since. Weaver also set single season records for the most home runs (29), total bases (254), on-base percentage (.479) and slugging average (.763). No pitcher won 20 games for the second year in a row, while South Bend's Janet Rumsey topped the league in earned run average (2.18) and complete games (21), ending second in wins (15), shutouts (5) and innings pitched (169). Gloria Cordes of Kalamazoo turned the best pitching performance of the year, when she hurled three consecutive shutouts in 34 scoreless innings of work. Weaver was honored with the Player of the Year Award at the end of the season.

The only team not to make it to the postseason was last-place Rockford Peaches, the most successful squad in league history after winning four titles in the previous 12 seasons, including three in a row at one point.

Standings

Postseason

First round
In the first round of the postseason, first place Fort Wayne faced third place Grand Rapids and second place South Bend played fourth place Kalamazoo. Fort Wayne defeated Grand Rapids, 8–7, in Game 1. After that, Grand Rapids team members voted not to play against Fort Wayne the next two contests, because the league had allowed Rockford catcher Ruth Richard to play on the Fort Wayne team as a last-minute replacement for Rita Briggs, who was sidelined with a broken wrist. During a debate over the eligibility of Richard, Fort Wayne manager Bill Allington and Grand Rapids manager Woody English came into a fistfight at home plate before Game 2. Grand Rapids forfeited both games to give the Daisies the first round. In the other series, Kalamazoo lost the first game to South Bend, 6–3, but pitchers Nancy Warren and Elaine Roth held the Blue Sox in the next two games by scores of 6–3 and 10–7, respectively.

Championship series
In Game 1 of the final series, the Kalamazoo Lassies defeated the Fort Wayne Daisies 17–9 behind a four-hit, seven strong innings from June Peppas, who also helped herself by hitting 2-for-4, including one home run. Her teammates Carol Habben, Fern Shollenberger and Chris Ballingall, who hit a grand slam, also slugged one each. Katherine Horstman connected two home runs for the Daisies in a lost cause, and her teammate Joanne Weaver slugged one. Maxine Kline, who had posted an 18–7 record with 3.23 earned run average during the regular season, gave up 11 runs in six innings and was credited with the loss.

Fort Wayne evened the series against Kalamazoo winning Game 2, 11–4, after hitting a series-record five home runs off two pitchers. Horstman started the feat with a two-run home run to open the score in the first inning. In the rest of the game, Betty Foss added two homers with five runs batted in, while Joanne Weaver and Jean Geissinger added solo shots. Nancy Mudge and Dorothy Schroeder homered for Kalamazoo, and Peppas, who played at first base, hit a solo homer in three at-bats. Marilyn Jones limited the Lassies to four runs on nine hits. Phyllis Baker was the winning pitcher and Gloria Cordes was the loser.

In Game 3, the Daisies beat the Lassies,  8–7, fueled again by a heavy hitting from Weaver, who hit a double, a triple and a three-run home run in five at bats, driving in four runs. Peppas went 1-for-4 to spark a seventh-inning three-run rally, but Fort Wayne came back in the bottom of the inning with two runs that marked the difference. Phyllis Baker won the game and Nancy Warren was the losing pitcher.

In other close score, Kalamazoo evened the series in Game 4 with a 6–5 victory against Fort Wayne, behind a strong pitching effort by Cordes, who hurled a complete game. Ballingall led the offensive with three hits, one run and one RBI before being ejected in the 9th inning. Peppas also contributed with a single, a double and one RBI in four at-bats. Kline lost her second decision in the series.

In decisive Game 5, Peppas pitched a clutch complete game and went 3-for-5 with an RBI against her former Daisies team, winning by an 8–5 margin to give the Lassies the championship title. She received support from Mary Taylor (5-for-5), Balingall (3-for-4) and Schroeder, who drove in the winning run off pitcher Jones in the bottom of the eight. Peppas finished with an average of .400 (6-for-15) and collected two of the three Lassies victories, to become the winning pitcher of the last game in league history.

Batting statistics

Pitching statistics

All-Star Game

Sources

See also
1954 Major League Baseball season
1954 Nippon Professional Baseball season

External links
AAGPBL Official Website
AAGPBL Records
Baseball Historian files
The Diamond Angle profiles and interviews
SABR Projects – Jim Sargent articles
YouTube videos

All-American Girls Professional Baseball League seasons
1950s in women's baseball
1954 in baseball
All